The Norfolk Island rail (Gallirallus sp.) is an extinct species of bird that lived on Norfolk Island in Australia. It was first identified by an illustration from the Album of Watercolour Drawings of Australian Natural History. It is important to note that the species has not been officially described by science.

Description
The Norfolk Island rail is described as a flightless brown rail with a white breast and stripes running down its body. The illustration from the Album of Watercolour Drawings of Australian Natural History is thought to represent this bird. It was noted to be an especially shy bird. It was hunted by falcons and owls, which likely played a part in its extinction. The Norfolk Island rail is thought to have been herbivorous and to wade through water. It likely went extinct around 1800 after the illustration was created, but may have become extinct long before. It is known to have had a small population and was rarely seen.

References

Extinct birds of Norfolk Island
Undescribed vertebrate species
Gallirallus